The Theft Act 1607 (c.6) is an Act of the Parliament of Scotland.

Title
"Act Anent woddis parkis planting dowcattis et cetera " (An Act concerning woods, parks, planting, doocots, etc.)

Content
The Act was subject to six separate repeals of words by section 1 of, and Schedule 1 to, the Statute Law Revision (Scotland) Act 1964 (c.80). Its form prior to those repeals was:

The 1964 Act repealed the following words, with effect from 31 July 1964:

Following the repeals, and until 2002, the Act looked like this:

(Our sovereign Lord and estates of this present parliament ... statutise and ordain that whosoever ... steals bees, or fishes in private ponds and lochs, shall be called and confined therefor as a breaker of the law ... before ... any ... ordinary magistrate within this realm ... and the penalty to be imposed and taken of the controveners before the said ordinary inferior judges ought not to exceed the sum of £40 of this realm.)

Repeals and amendments
The Act was amended by the Salmon and Freshwater Fisheries (Consolidation) (Scotland) Act 2003 which removed the words "and fisches in propir stankis and loches" thus leaving only bees ("Beis") as the subjects of this Act.

References

External links

1607 in law
1607 in Scotland
Acts of the Parliament of Scotland